"So What the Fuss" is a song from Stevie Wonder's 2005 album A Time to Love. The song features En Vogue and Prince.

Charts

References

2005 singles
Stevie Wonder songs
En Vogue songs
Prince (musician) songs
Music videos directed by Paul Hunter (director)
Songs written by Stevie Wonder
Song recordings produced by Stevie Wonder